Khotokha Valley (ཁོ་ཐང་ཁ in Dzongkha) is a valley in Wangdue Phodrang District in central Bhutan. The valley floor consist of a wide wetland which is often used by the Black-necked Cranes in winter. The valley was designated as a Ramsar site in 2012.

References

Populated places in Bhutan
Valleys of Bhutan
Ramsar sites in Bhutan
Important Bird Areas of Bhutan